Chase the Dragon is the third studio album by English rock band Magnum. It was released in 1982 on Jet Records. Overseen by the Kansas producer Jeff Glixman, Chase the Dragon was the first recorded appearance by the new keyboard player Mark Stanway, although he had made his live debut at Magnum's appearance at the Reading Festival in 1980. The album was recorded over 13 days at Town House Studios in London, and the following year Tony Clarkin flew to Axis Studios in Atlanta to mix it. However, there was a two-year delay before the album's release in 1982. Many of the tracks have remained in Magnum's live set for many years, including "Soldier of the Line", "The Spirit" and "Sacred Hour".

Chase the Dragon was eventually released in March 1982, two years after the recording sessions, reaching the Top 20 in the UK charts, peaking at #17. "The Lights Burned Out" was released as a single in February 1982, followed by an EP in September 1982 with two new studio songs "Back to Earth" and "Hold Back Your Love" with two live tracks recorded in Nashville, Tennessee, in 1982, whilst supporting Ozzy Osbourne (later released on Invasion Live). It is also noted as the first Magnum album with Rodney Matthews' artwork. The 2005 expanded version of the album was reissued on 22 September 2006 in Japan with mini LP/paper sleeve packaging through Arcangelo. The album was also included in a limited edition Japanese box set, consisting of all six of Sanctuary Records expanded and remastered releases with mini LP/paper sleeve packaging. The set included an outer box showing Magnum's Chase the Dragon artwork.

Track listing

Cover sleeve 
The cover art was designed by Rodney Matthews.

"My original brief for Magnum's 'Chase the Dragon' album cover was given by Tony Clarkin, founder member of the band, who writes all the music and lyrics. In the first instance the record was to have been called 'The Spirit' and my rough visuals were prepared with that title in mind. The album, which was intended to be a gatefold sleeve, ended up in a standard container because the record company could not justify the extra expense.

"This was a pity I felt, because I had designed two images to relate to each other and read from front to inside spread. The first being the work 'Chase the Dragon' and the second, 'Sanctuary'. The city depicted in each was appropriated to the title 'The Spirit', but I find it difficult to equate it with the replacement title 'Chase the Dragon' which is a slang term for an oriental practice in drug abuse." — Rodney Matthews

Reissues

Bonus tracks 
Sanctuary Records released a 2005 remastered and expanded edition with bonus tracks.

"Back to Earth", "Hold Back Your Love", "Soldier of the Line" and "Sacred Hour" (disc 1, 9 – 12)
Were released and an EP called "Live in America", with two live tracks recorded in Nashville, Tennessee, in 1982, while supporting Ozzy Osbourne (originally released on Invasion Live) and two new studio tracks recorded during the Chase the Dragon sessions.

"Long Days Black Nights" (disc 1, 13)
Was the B-Side to the single "The Light Burned Out".

"Lights Burned Out" (Disc 1, 14)
This was recorded at Zella Studios in Birmingham in late 1979 and is the original version before a chorus was written. This was intended for the album Chase the Dragon. — Tony Clarkin

Originally released in Jet Records' 1993 compilation Archive.

"The Spirit" (disc 1, 15)
Recorded in Nashville, Tennessee, in 1982, while supporting Ozzy Osbourne, (originally released on Invasion Live).

"Soldier of the Line" (disc 1, 16)
Released in 1993 on Magnum's acoustic album, Keeping The Nite Light Burning.

Singles 
The Lights Burned Out 7" (February 1982)
 "The Lights Burned Out" [LP version] – 4:32
 "Long Days Black Nights" [B-side] – 3:11

Live in America 7" (September 1982)
 "Back to Earth" [A-side] – 3:39
 "Hold Back Your Love" [A-side] – 3:22

Live in America EP (September 1982)
 "Back to Earth" [A-side] – 3:39
 "Hold Back Your Love" [A-side] – 3:22
 "Soldier of the Line" [live] – 3:51
 "Sacred Hour" [live] – 5:45

Personnel 
 Bob Catley — vocals
 Tony Clarkin — guitar
 Wally Lowe — bass guitar
 Mark Stanway — keyboards
 Kex Gorin — drums

Production 
 Recorded at the Town House Studios, London, England
 Produced and engineered by Jeff Glixman
 Assistant engineer – Steve Prestage
 Mixed at Axis Sound Studios, Atlanta, Georgia, USA

Related information 
The song "The Spirit" was covered by the German power metal band Edguy on their 2005 EP "Superheroes".

Stian Aarstad, the former pianist of the symphonic black metal band Dimmu Borgir, used the intro to "Sacred Hour" as the intro to the song "Alt Lys er Svunnet Hen" on their album Stormblåst. Aarstad neglected to tell them this. The intro to the song was left out in the re-recording of the album in 2005.

References

External links 
 www.magnumonline.co.uk — Official Magnum site
 Chase The Dragon: Expanded Edition – Sanctuary Records' mini site
 Record Covers — at rodneymatthews.com

Magnum (band) albums
1982 albums
Jet Records albums
Albums with cover art by Rodney Matthews
Albums produced by Jeff Glixman